Vasi-ye Sofla (also Romanized as Vaşī-ye Soflá; also known as Vāsī, Vaşī-ye Pā’īn, and Wassi) is a village in Zhavarud-e Sharqi Rural District, in the Central District of Sanandaj County, Kurdistan Province, Iran. At the 2006 census, its population was 404, in 97 families. The village is populated by Kurds.

References 

Towns and villages in Sanandaj County
Kurdish settlements in Kurdistan Province